Hanna Hopko (born 4 March 1982) is a Ukrainian politician and a former Member of Parliament and head of the committee on foreign affairs of Ukraine's Verkhovna Rada. She did not participate in the 2019 Ukrainian parliamentary election.
 
Hopko is also a member of the executive committee of the National Council of Reforms and the Anti-Corruption Action Center (AntAC).

Early life and education
Hopko was born 4 March 1982 in Hanachivka, Peremyshliany Raion, Lviv Oblast. In 2004, she received a MA in international journalism at Lviv University, PhD in Social Communications in 2009 and a CEP Diploma for achievements in ecological teaching from the Civic Education Project. In 2008 she completed the Leadership Program in TC at Johns Hopkins Bloomberg School of Public Health. In 2009 she received a PhD in social communications at Taras Shevchenko National University of Kyiv. In 2012 she studied at the Ukrainian School of Political Studies. In 2017, she completed the program Transformational Leadership: Leadership at the Edge at Saïd Business School, University of Oxford.

Career

Civil society activities

Hopko has contributed to various training programs for civil society activists in Ukraine, Kazakhstan, the Kyrgyz Republic, Georgia, and Belarus.

From 2005 to 2007, she worked as communications manager of the Ukraine Citizen Action Network (UCAN/ISC, USAID contractor) in Kyiv, and led environmental journalism training programs in Donetsk Oblast, Belarus and Kazakhstan.

In 2009, she co-founded the Life Regional Advocacy Center, Ukraine's primary partner of the Bloomberg Initiative to reduce tobacco use, and the Ukrainian representative of ENSP, FCA and WHO. Hopko was deputy director of the Center until April 2012.

In 2009 Hopko also became an advocacy coordinator of the National Coalition of NGOs and Initiatives For Smoke-Free Ukraine. She successfully advocated for five tobacco-control laws, including a complete ban on tobacco advertising and sponsorship; a ban on smoking in all public and indoor work areas; the implementation of  graphic warnings on cigarette packaging; and an increase in tobacco taxes. According to the World Health Organization's 2011 report on tobacco, Ukraine moved from 4th to 29th in the world for prevalence of smoking, due largely to efforts led by Hopko.

In January 2012, Hopko became a member of the Board of Trustees of the Ohkmatdyt National Children's Specialized Hospital.

From 2010 to 2012, she was an adviser for the Morality, Spirituality and National Health parliamentary group. From January 2011 to September 2014, she was an advocacy expert at the Institute of Political Education (expert at seminars for assistants, advisors of Members of the Parliament, civic activist) and at the National Democracy Institute (NDI).

From February to September 2014, she worked as a coordinator of the Reanimation Package of Reforms initiative and served in an inter-factional parliamentary group, Platform of the Reforms.

Political career

During the parliamentary elections following the EuroMaidan revolution, Hopko headed the list of the Samopomich (of Self Reliance) Party, and was elected to the Parliament of Ukraine, where she was appointed chair of the Foreign Affairs Committee on 4 December 2014.

Hopko was one of a group of young MPs who rode the 2014 revolutionary wave of youth into the upper echelons of Ukrainian politics. The group's supporters considered them less corruptible, as they weren't part of the country's old elite networks that consisted mostly of men who'd gained wealth and power through backdoor deals after the fall of Communism.

Supporting the ratification of the Rome Statute of the International Criminal Court, Hopko stated: "It is a demonstration of readiness to build a rule-of-law state in which it is possible to punish for crimes against humanity and genocide."

On 31 August 2015, Hopko and four other MPs of the Self Reliance party voted in support of amendments to the Ukrainian Constitution that would lead to decentralization. As a result, she and the other MPs were ousted from the party "with great honor". Hopko stated that the constitutional amendment was "an important step towards comprehensive change in Ukraine" and contained "no concessions to Russia".

In May 2017, she co-sponsored a bill in the Ukrainian parliament requiring 75% of national television programming, and 50% of local programming, to be in the Ukrainian language. Hopko and her associates believe that widespread use of the Russian language undermines Ukrainian statehood.

Hopko did not participate in the 2019 Ukrainian parliamentary election.

Family 
Hopko is married and has two daughters.

Honors and awards
 National Democratic Institute 2014 Democracy Award, (December 2014)
 Certificate of Merit (October 2014), Georgetown Leadership Seminar, School of Foreign Service, Georgetown University.
 Leading Global Thinker (2014), Foreign Policy Magazine.

References

External links 

 
 Article in "The Day" newspaper "After the meeting with Biden"

1982 births
Living people
People from Lviv Oblast
University of Lviv alumni
Self Reliance (political party) politicians
Eighth convocation members of the Verkhovna Rada
21st-century Ukrainian politicians
21st-century Ukrainian women politicians
People of the Euromaidan
Women members of the Verkhovna Rada